William Abitbol (6 September 1949 – 22 December 2016) was a French politician and, in later life, a restaurateur. His father was a Tunisian Jew. He was a member of the far-right militant group "Occident" as a young man. He started his career as an advisor to Charles Pasqua. He served as a member of the European Parliament from 1999 to 2004. He was a member of the Rally for France. As of 2009, he was the owner of Chez Alfred, a French restaurant in Paris. He died of cancer on 22 December 2016 and he was buried at the Montparnasse Cemetery.

References

1949 births
2016 deaths
French people of Tunisian-Jewish descent
Politicians from Paris
MEPs for France 2009–2014
French restaurateurs
Deaths from cancer in France